The separation of powers is a model for the governance of a state. 

Separation of powers may also refer to:

 Separation of Power, 2001 novel by Vince Flynn
 "Separation of Powers" (The West Wing), episode 95 of The West Wing